Saint-Adolphe-d'Howard is a municipality in the Laurentian Mountains, in the Province of Quebec, Canada, north-west of Montreal.

Demographics
Population trend:
 Population in 2011: 3702 (2006 to 2011 population change: 3.9%)
 Population in 2006: 3563
 2001 to 2006 population change: 32.7%
 Population in 2001: 2684
 Population in 1996: 2632
 Population in 1991: 2263

Private dwellings occupied by usual residents: 1822 (total dwellings: 3591)

Mother tongue:
 English as first language: 18.5%
 French as first language: 77%
 Other as first language: 4.5%

Education

Sir Wilfrid Laurier School Board operates Anglophone public schools:
 Sainte Agathe Academy in Sainte-Agathe-des-Monts serves the northern portion for both elementary and secondary levels.
 Morin Heights Elementary School (serves the southern portion) in Morin-Heights
 Laurentian Regional High School (serves the southern portion) in Lachute

See also
List of municipalities in Quebec

References

External links

 Official site of Saint-Adolphe-d'Howard
 st-adolphe.info (Local news, information, and community agenda)
 Pays-d'en-Haut CLD (Local Development Centre)
   Mont-Avalanche (Ski and Sports Station)
   Association des sports nautiques des lacs St-Joseph et Ste-Marie, Saint-Adolphe-d'Howard (Local Association)

Municipalities in Quebec
Incorporated places in Laurentides